Los Amos del Valle (Masters of the Valley) is a Venezuelan novel written by psychiatrist Francisco Herrera Luque and published in 1979. The novel describes Venezuelan life since the conquest of Caracas Valley until Simón Bolivar's baptism.

See also
Venezuelan novels
List of Venezuelan writers

Venezuelan novels
1979 novels
Novels set in Venezuela